Dypsis ambanjae is a species of flowering plant in the family Arecaceae, endemic to the Madagascarian rainforests. The last specimen was collected more than 80 years ago, and it may be extinct. Although originally treated under the genus Phloga in 1933, it was published under the currently accepted nomenclature in 1995.

References

ambanjae
Endemic flora of Madagascar
Critically endangered plants
Plants described in 1995
Taxonomy articles created by Polbot
Taxa named by Henk Jaap Beentje